Country Canada may refer to two separate entities under the auspices of the Canadian Broadcasting Corporation:

 CBC News: Country Canada, the long-running rural affairs series
 CBC Country Canada, the former name of the Canadian digital specialty channel bold